Gary Dean Lance (born September 21, 1948) is a former baseball pitcher. He played briefly for the Kansas City Royals of Major League Baseball (MLB) in its 1977 season. Listed at 6' 3", 195 lb., Lance batted and threw right handed. He was born in Greenville, South Carolina and attended Dentsville High School in Columbia, SC and continued playing baseball for University of South Carolina.

Career
The Royals signed Lance as a free agent in 1971. He spent six seasons in the minor leagues playing at six different levels.

In 1974, while pitching for the Double-A Jacksonville Suns, Lance hurled a no-hitter against the Birmingham A's. He averaged 12 wins in four of these seasons, with a career-high 16 victories in 1977, before joining the big team late in the year.

Lance debuted with Kansas City on September 28, 1977, pitching two innings of relief against the Oakland Athletics. He came into the game in the 8th inning to replace Mark Littell, after the A's had tied the game at 5–5. Lance got the last out of the inning, pitched a scoreless 9th, then gave up the winning run in the 10th to take the loss. He never appeared in a major league game again.

Lance returned to the minors for three more years, retiring in 1980. He posted an 80–72 record with a 3.75 ERA in 10 minor league seasons.

Following his playing career, Lance spent many years as a minor league pitching coach, most recently with the Portland Beavers in 2007.

In between, Lance played winter ball in Venezuela with the Tiburones de La Guaira and Tigres de Aragua clubs, as well as in Puerto Rico for the Lobos de Arecibo, Indios de Mayagüez and Vaqueros de Bayamón. While pitching for Arecibo, he was a member of the 1983 Caribbean Series champion team.

Lance made a short return in 1990, while pitching for the Florida Tropics of the short-lived Senior Professional Baseball Association.

References

External links
, or Retrosheet

1948 births
Living people
American expatriate baseball players in Mexico
Baseball players from South Carolina
Gulf Coast Royals players
Indios de Mayagüez players
Jacksonville Suns players
Kansas City Royals players
Lobos de Arecibo players
Major League Baseball pitchers
Mexican League baseball pitchers
Minor league baseball coaches
Omaha Royals players
San Jose Bees players
Spokane Indians players
Sportspeople from Greenville, South Carolina
Sultanes de Monterrey players
Tiburones de La Guaira players
American expatriate baseball players in Venezuela
Tigres de Aragua players
Vaqueros de Bayamón players
West Palm Beach Tropics players